La Loma Foods, formerly named Loma Linda Food Company and Loma Linda Foods, and with products presently branded under the name Loma Linda and Loma, is a former food manufacturing company that produced vegetarian and vegan foods. It is presently an active brand of vegetarian and vegan food products produced and purveyed by the Atlantic Natural Foods Company of Nashville, North Carolina. Loma Linda Foods began operations in 1905 under the name The Sanitarium Food Company and was owned by the Seventh-day Adventist Church until 1990.

Overview
La Loma Foods is a former food manufacturing company and brand presently owned by Atlantic Natural Foods Company, based in Nashville, North Carolina, that manufactures and sells vegetarian and vegan foods. Food products are presently branded under the name "Loma Linda" by the Atlantic Natural Foods Company. The company was previously owned by the Seventh-day Adventist Church and Worthington Foods. The company began operations in 1905 under the name The Sanitarium Food Company, and produced crackers, breads and cookies. Additional health foods were later produced by the company, such as the breakfast cereal Ruskets, and the company also expanded to produce infant formula and meat analogue products.

At the time the Loma Linda Food Company was founded in 1933, it produced some of the first meat analogue products prepared from soy and wheat that were available in the United States on a commercial basis. In the 1960s, Loma Linda Foods and Worthington Foods were the largest manufacturers of soy-based foods in the United States. Foods sold under the present Loma Linda brand name include canned vegetarian/meat analogue products such as chili, taco filling and faux meats such as sausage, chicken, tuna, scallops and steak.

History
Loma Linda Foods was preceded by the Loma Linda Sanitarium bakery, officially named The Sanitarium Food Company, which began operations in 1905 in Loma Linda, California. The company under the name Loma Linda Food Company was created in 1933, at which time it opened a new production facility in La Sierra, near Riverside, California.

The company's name was changed to La Loma Foods in 1989, and in 1989 the company sold its infant formula brand and line to N.V. Nutricia, a Dutch company. The Seventh-day Adventist Church sold the company to Worthington Foods of Ohio in 1990, and Worthington Foods was acquired by The Kellogg Company in 1999. The Kellogg Company sold the company to the Atlantic Natural Foods Company in 2015.

Products
Currently, Atlantic Natural Foods labels the La Loma products which they acquired from Kellogg's with both the Worthington and Loma Linda logo. Products include:
 Big Franks
 Dinner Cuts (no longer manufactured)
 Fried Chik'n
 Little Links
 Linketts
 Nuteena (no longer manufactured)
 Redi-Burger 
 Swiss Stakes
 Tender Bits
 Tender Rounds
 Vege-Burger

Products that were produced by Worthington Foods and are now labeled as both Loma Linda and Worthington are as follows:
 Chili
 Choplets
 Diced Chik
 FriChik
 Multigrain Cutlets (no longer manufactured)
 Prime Stakes
 Saucettes
 Super Links
 Vegetarian Burger
 Vegetable Skallops
 Vegetable Steaks
 Veja-Links

See also

 List of vegetarian and vegan companies
 Earth's Own Food Company - A Seventh-day Adventist food company in British Columbia, Canada 
 Sahmyook Foods – A Seventh-day Adventist food company in South Korea
 Sanitarium Health and Wellbeing Company - A Seventh-day Adventist food company in Melbourne, Victoria, Australia

References

Food and drink companies based in North Carolina
Breakfast cereal companies
Food product brands
Vegetarian companies and establishments of the United States
Former Seventh-day Adventist institutions
1905 establishments in California